ARF GTPase-activating protein GIT1 is an enzyme that in humans is encoded by the GIT1 gene.

GIT1 contains an ARFGAP domain, Anykrin repeats, and a GRK-interacting domain. The Arf-GAP domain, which enables it to act as a GTPase activating protein (GAP) for the Arf family of GTPases, has been shown to be involved in phosphorylation and inhibition of the ADRB2. If synaptic localization of GIT1 is disturbed, then this is known to affect dendritic spine morphology and formation---this is thought to occur through the Rac1/PAK1/LIMK/CFL1 pathway.

Interactions
GIT1 has been shown to interact with:

 ARHGEF7, 
 Beta adrenergic receptor kinase,
 GIT2,
 PCLO, 
 PLCG1, 
 PPFIA4 
 PTK2,  and
 liprin-alpha-1.

References

Further reading

External links
GIT1 Info with links in the Cell Migration Gateway